"White Silver Sands" is a popular song. The words and music were written in 1957 by Charles "Red" Matthews, although partial authorship is also claimed by Gladys Reinhart.

The song was a hit for Don Rondo in the summer of 1957, and peaked at number seven on the Billboard Charts. An uptempo number, it was Rondo's second hit, and a contrast to the ballads he had recorded up to that point.

Other charting versions
Bill Black's Combo version reached number nine in 1960 in the Billboard Pop Chart and number 1 on the R&B chart.
Sonny James' version reached number five on the U.S. Billboard Hot Country Singles chart.

References

1957 singles
1960 singles
1950s instrumentals
1957 songs